Rosie's Theater Kids, formerly known as Rosie's Broadway Kids, is a non-profit arts education organization started by actress and comedian Rosie O'Donnell. RTKids was founded in 2003 and continually provides training in dance, music, and drama for students attending New York City public schools.

It is based on the Maravel Arts Center, 445 W. 45th St., in Hell's Kitchen, Manhattan.  The center is named for O'Donnel's teacher Pat Maravel who was instrumental in O'Donnell's interest in theatre.

Programs

PS Broadway

PS Broadway is the RTKids in-school program for NYC public school fifth-
graders. During the year, RTKids staff members teach dance and music as part of a 15-week program that serves 22 schools throughout Manhattan. As part of this program, every class of students takes a free trip to see a Broadway musical and then participates in a question-and-answer session with performers, directors, conductors, and members of the production's technical staff. Each semester this program is wrapped up with a school assembly where the kids can perform to and with their peers, parents, and teachers.

ACTE II (A Commitment to Excellence)

ACTE II is Rosie's Theater Kids scholarship program in which graduates of PS Broadway get the opportunity to receive further training in free after-school classes in ballet, tap, jazz, voice, and drama. Part of ACTE II is the Summer Intensive: an all-day, Monday through Friday summer program that provides group classes and private lessons, preparing the students for a final performance for family, friends, and industry professionals.

Spotlight on Fitness

Developed in collaboration with a school-based health care program and the NYC Department of Education, Spotlight on Fitness (SoFit) is a physical education program that fulfills state and local curriculum requirements in both the arts and physical education.

A+

The newest initiative of RTKids, A+ (Arts-Plus) provides supplementary tools to 
enhance the academic achievement of the ACTE II students at the secondary level. This program includes after-school tutoring, High School admission guidance, private coaching and preparation for performing arts school auditions (both high school and collegiate), and professional PSAT and SAT preparatory classes.

History
In April 2003, Rosie's Theater Kids was founded by Rosie O'Donnell, Kelli Carpenter, and RBKids Artistic Director, Lori Klinger. Since introducing the program to its first school in Manhattan, RTKids has expanded to serve over 5,000 students at 22 schools in Harlem, Midtown West, Chelsea, Lower East Side, East Village, Chinatown, and Brooklyn.
The ACTE II program has also expanded, with new 5th grade students added annually from PS Broadway classes to a new "team" of students each year. Currently ACTE II has five teams.

Appearances

Off-Broadway
 Brundibar, 5/7/06 – 5/21/06

Television
 Rachel Ray, 8/25/08
 The Martha Stewart Show, 10/31/07
 'The View', 12/21/06
 The Rosie Show
 Opera

Benefit Performances
 Gilda's Club Benefit, 5/17/07, 5/15/08
 National Foundation for Facial Reconstruction Gala, 3/12/07
 Career Transition for Dancers Gala, 10/23/06
 Northside Center for Child Development Gala, 5/30/06

References

 Rosie's Theater Kids Homepage, rosiestheaterkids.org
 Stasio, Marilyn (May 7, 2006). Brundibar. Variety (magazine).

Broadway theatre
Arts organizations established in 2003
Public education in New York City